Slobodan Prosperov Novak (born 11 April 1951), is a Croatian literature historian, comparativist and theatrologist.

Biography
Prosperov Novak was born in Belgrade, but spent his childhood in Dubrovnik. He graduated comparative literature in 1973 at the Faculty of Humanities and Social Sciences in Zagreb, receiving his M.A. in 1976 and Ph.D. in 1978. He worked as a journalist in a periodical Vjesnik u srijedu (1973–1974).

In 1977 he is an assistant, and in 1988 a professor of Old Croatian literature at the Faculty of Philosophy. In the period of 1981-1984 he teaches at the Institute for Slavic Philology of the University of Rome, and from 1990 to 1992 he serves as an assistant of the minister of education, culture and sport of the Republic of Croatia.

In 1990–1992 he was the president of the council of Dubrovnik Summer Festival, and in 2000 served as its head.

He was the initiator and the first editor-in-chief of Matica hrvatska's periodical Vijenac.

He was also the editor of the journal Lettre internationale and the magazine Cicero.

For a number of years he edited a periodical of Croatian writers Most ("The Bridge"). He served as a president of Croatian PEN society in the period 1990–2000, organizing with his co-workers in 1993, in war-affected Dubrovnik, the 59th Word PEN Congress. In 1998 he instituted Mediterranean Institute Grga Novak on the island of Hvar.

From 2001 to 2005 he taught South Slavic philology at the Department for Slavic studies of the University of Yale in New Haven, USA. Since 2010, he teaches literature at the Academy of Dramatic Art in Zagreb.

He edited several books on Croatian writers, authored many literary anthologies, and was the creator of multimedial projects, such as the theater shows Ecce homo and Kako bratja prodaše Jozefa at Dubrovnik Summer Festival in 1995.

He worked on a grand exhibition "Gundulićev san" ("Gundulić's dream") in 1989 in the museum space of the city of Zagreb.

Notable works
Some of his notable published works are:

 Dubrovački eseji i zapisi, 1975
 Teatar u Dubrovniku prije Marina Držića, 1977
 Vučistrah i dubrovačka tragikomedija, 1979
 Komparatističke zagonetke, 1979
 Zašto se Euridika osvrnula, 1981
 Planeta Držić, 1984
 Dubrovnik iznova, 1987.
 Kad su đavli voljeli hrvatski, 1988
 Hrvatski pluskvamperfekt, 1991
 Figure straha, 1994
 Povijest hrvatske književnosti (three volumes), 1996, 1997, 1999
 Kratka povijest avanturizma, 2001
 Zlatno doba, 2002
 Povijest hrvatske književnosti 2003
 Povijest hrvatske književnosti.I- IV, Zagreb, Slobodna Dalmacija i Marjan tisak,Split,2004. 
Dubrovnik revisited,Zagreb,MTV,2004. 47.-49. Volite li Dubrovnik, Zagreb,VBZ,2005 (Hrvatsko, englesko i francusko izdanje) 
Tragedije XVI. stoljeća.Zagreb,Matica hrvatska,2006. 
Hvar.Mjesta-ljudi-sudbine. Zagreb,Matica hrvatska, 2006. 
101 Dalmatinac i poneki Vlaj,Matica hrvatska,2007. 
Vježbanje renesanse.Predavanja iz književnosti na Sveučilištu Yale.Algoritam, 2008. 
Slaveni u renesansi, Matica hrvatska,Zagreb, 2009. 
 Leksikon Marina Držića.,I-II. Slobodan Prosperov Novak et alia, Leksikografski zavod Miroslav Krleža, Zagreb,2009. 
 Pričaj mi o Europi, Naklada Ljevak,Zagreb 2009.
 101 Dalmatinka, Projekt Polis, Split, 2010.
Zločesti tekstovi, Profil, Zagreb, 2010.
Boka Kotorska od kampanela do kampanela, AGM, Zagreb,2011.
Knjiga o teatru, AGM, Zagreb,2014.
Književnost ranog novovjekovlja u Boki kotorskoj.S Viktorijom Franić Tomić, Hrvatska sveučilišna naklada, Zagreb,2014.
Abrahamova žrtva.S Viktorijom Franić Tomić.Matica hrvatska, Zagreb,2015. 
Split.Monografija. S Ivom Pervanom.Lilliput Planet, Zagreb,2015.
Marin Držić,Izabrana djela,I-II, Stoljeća hrvatske književnosti, Zagreb,2011-2015.
 Zlatna knjiga bokeljskih književnika.S Viktorijom Franić Tomić,Lilliput Planet,Zagreb,2016.
 Vruja.Grad vode i vjetra. Splićanka d.o.o., Split,2016. (+ prijevod na engleski jezik i ruski jezik)
Pisac i vlast.Poetika Marina Držića, Školska knjiga, Zagreb,2017.
 Povijest hrvatske književnosti.I- IV, Zagreb, Slobodna Dalmacija i Marjan tisak,Split,2004.

References

1951 births
Faculty of Humanities and Social Sciences, University of Zagreb alumni
Living people
Croatian essayists
Croatian male writers
Male essayists
Croatian literary historians
People from Dubrovnik